Dream II is the first EP by avant-garde/progressive/death metal band Pan.Thy.Monium released in 1991.

Track listing
"I" – 4:26
"II" – 3:31
"III" – 3:46
"Vvoiiccheeces" – 1:29
"IV" - 5:47

Album information
Recorded in Gorysound
Everything vital created by Raagoonshinnaah
Logo by Ghoobaah
Artwork by Paw
First press 7" vinyl only
Re-released in 95 by Avantgarde Music as Mini CD with IV as bonus track

Personnel
Derelict aka Robert ``Robban`` Karlsson - vocals 
Winter aka Benny Larsson - drums, percussion and violin 
Day DiSyraah aka Dan Swanö - bass, keyboards and effects   
Mourning aka Robert Ivarsson - rhythm guitars  
Äag aka Tom Nouga aka Dag Swanö - lead guitars, organ and baritone saxophone

External links
Encyclopaedia Metallum page

Pan.Thy.Monium albums
1991 EPs